Mitenskoye is a rural locality (a village) in Mayskoye Rural Settlement, Vologodsky District, Vologda Oblast, Russia. The population was 5 as of 2002.

Geography 
The distance to Vologda is 19.5 km, to Maysky is 7 km. Pribytkovo is the nearest rural locality.

References 

Rural localities in Vologodsky District